The Vancouver Canadians are a Minor League Baseball team located in Vancouver, British Columbia. They are members of the Northwest League and are affiliated with the Toronto Blue Jays. The Canadians play their home games at Nat Bailey Stadium. They are currently the only MiLB team based in Canada.

History
Prior the 1999 season, the Vancouver Canadians Pacific Coast League franchise was purchased by a group led by Art Savage with the intention of relocating to Sacramento, California. Despite winning the Pacific Coast League title and the Triple-A World Series the Canadians moved to California's capital city.  Vancouver would not be without baseball as the Southern Oregon Timberjacks of the Northwest League announced relocation to fill the void in Vancouver. The Canadians name resumed as members of the Class A-Short Season Northwest League in 2000.

Like the predecessor Pacific Coast League franchise, the new Canadians signed a player development contract with the Oakland Athletics.
The Canadians had players such as Nick Swisher, Jeremy Brown, Jason Windsor, Joe Blanton, Rich Harden, Travis Buck, Dallas Braden, and Dan Straily on teams during this period.

In 2007, local Vancouver businessmen Jake Kerr and Jeff Mooney purchased the Vancouver Canadians and secured a 25-year lease with the City of Vancouver Parks Board. Extensive work began that offseason in a full-scale stadium renovation which improved washrooms, concessions, concourses, and children's play area. Point-of-purchase concessions increased substantially.

In January 2008, former Washington Nationals executive Andy Dunn become the President and General Manager of the Canadians.

In the spring of 2010, the Vancouver Canadians and Scotiabank announced a long-term partnership that would see Nat Bailey Stadium renamed to Scotiabank Field at Nat Bailey Stadium.

The Canadians became the Short Season A affiliate of the Toronto Blue Jays following the 2010 season. This helped see the team's attendance rise to 162,162 for the season, a team record. In September 2011, the Vancouver Canadians won their first Northwest League championship title, defeating the Tri-City Dust Devils, 9–2, to win the final series, 2–1. The following year, the Vancouver Canadians became back-to-back champions for the first time in franchise history, defeating the Boise Hawks, 12–9, to win the final series, 2–1.

In August 2013, outfielder Kevin Pillar became the first alumnus of the team to play in the major leagues for Toronto.

On September 9, 2013 the Canadians became just the third Northwest League team to win three straight championships, defeating the Boise Hawks, 5–0, at Scotiabank Field at Nat Bailey Stadium to win the final series, 2–1, in front of a sellout crowd. The 2013 season also saw the Vancouver Canadians draw over 195,000 fans to Scotiabank Field, a fifth consecutive team record which included 23 sold-out games.

On November 4, 2013, the Vancouver Canadians were named the 2013 recipient of the John H. Johnson President's Award. The prestigious award is given to Minor League Baseball's top organization. It was the first time that a Canadian-based franchise won MiLB's top award.

In 2016, the Canadians led the Northwest League with a total attendance of 222,363, averaging 6,177 per game. This earned them the 2016 Esurance "Home Field Advantage Award" given to the organization in each affiliated minor league with the greatest attendance per percentage capacity. In 2017, the Canadians won another championship, defeating Eugene, 2–1, to win the series, 3–1. They beat their previous record in attendance with 239,527 people in total attendance for the 2017 season, averaging to 6,303 per game. On January 26, 2018, Toronto extended their player-development contract with Vancouver through the 2022 season.

While the Canadians were unable to make the playoffs in 2018, coming in a close second in both the first and second half of the season, they still lead the league in attendance with an impressive 239,086 in total attendance.

Due to the COVID-19 pandemic, the Minor League Baseball season was cancelled. In the winter of 2020 as part the reorganization of minor league baseball, Vancouver received an invitation to continue as the Blue Jays' High-A affiliate. In a further change, they were organized into the High-A West along with five other teams previously of the Northwest League.

The team began the 2021 season playing its home games at Ron Tonkin Field (the home field of the Hillsboro Hops) in Hillsboro, Oregon due to COVID-19 border restrictions. In 2022, the High-A West became known as the Northwest League, the name historically used by the regional circuit prior to the 2021 reorganization.

Early professional baseball in Vancouver
Vancouver was an influential entity in the early history of the Northwest League. They were charter members of every version of the league that would eventually form the NWL, most notably as the sole team that survived the collapse of the Western International League (WIL) in 1922 when it reformed in 1937, winning four pennants in the WIL (1942, 1947, 1949, and 1954) as the Vancouver Capilanos (1939–1954). However, even though they were the final champions of the WIL, Vancouver was not part of its reformation into the Northwest League, due to the NWL's shedding of all of its Canadian teams in order to focus on the American Pacific Northwest. Vancouver was without professional baseball in 1955, but in 1956 the highest calibre of minor league play, in the form of the Open classification Pacific Coast League, came to British Columbia when Oakland Oaks transferred there as the Vancouver Mounties. The Mounties played in the PCL from 1956 through 1962, and from 1965 through 1969.

Ballpark
The Canadians play their home games at Nat Bailey Stadium.

Season-by-season records

Canadians attendance

Roster

Media 
In the 2019 season, radio rights moved from CKST to CISL Sportsnet 650. As part of the deal, Sportsnet Pacific also gained rights to air a package of Canadians games on television.

Notable former players in the major leagues

Alek Manoah (2019)
Cavan Biggio (2016)
Tim Mayza (2014)
Miguel Castro (2014)
Ryan Borucki (2014)
Franklin Barreto (2014)
Richard Urena (2014)
Roberto Osuna (2012)
Daniel Norris (2012)
Dalton Pompey (2012)
Marcus Stroman (2012)
Kevin Pillar (2011)
Aaron Sanchez (2011)
Noah Syndergaard (2011)
Justin Nicolino (2011)
AJ Griffin (2010)
Ian Krol (2009)
Dan Straily (2009)
Max Stassi (2009)
Sean Doolittle (2007)
Andrew Bailey (2006)
Justin Sellers (2005)
Jeff Gray (2005)
Anthony Recker (2005)
Travis Buck (2005)
Kurt Suzuki (2004)
Dallas Braden (2004)
Landon Powell (2004)
Gregorio Petit (2004)
Alexi Ogando (2004)
Omar Quintanilla (2003)
Andre Ethier (2003)
Santiago Casilla (2002)
Jared Burton (2002)
Joe Blanton (2002)
Mark Teahen (2002)
Nick Swisher (2002)
Nelson Cruz (2002)
John Baker (2002)
Mike Wood (2001)
Rich Harden (2001)
Neal Cotts (2001)
Dan Johnson (2001)
Franklyn Germán (2000)
Ron Flores (2000)
Freddie Bynum (2000)

References

External links
 Vancouver Canadians

Canadians
Baseball teams established in 2000
Oakland Athletics minor league affiliates
Toronto Blue Jays minor league affiliates
Northwest League teams
2000 establishments in British Columbia
High-A West teams